Chugawan is a village located in the Moga district of Punjab, India. The total literacy rate of Chugawan is 79.49%, out of which the individual literacy values by sex are 85.91% for males and 72.12% for females of the locality. There are about 497 houses located in the village. The village belongs to the Malwai culture and the Malwai dialect of Punjabi is spoken by the locals.

References 

Populated places in Punjab, India